Gummy is a kind of gelatin candy.

Gummy or gummi may also refer to:

Places and jurisdictions 
 Gummi in Byzacena, a city and former bishopric in Roman Africa, now a Latin Catholic titular see
 Gummi in Proconsulari, a city and former bishopric in Roman Africa, now a Latin Catholic titular see
 Gummi, Nigeria, a local government area in Zamfara State, Nigeria

Other 
 Gummy (singer) (born 1981), Korean R&B singer
 Gummibär, a German international multi-lingual character and virtual band
 Gummi (software), a LaTeX editor for Linux/Gnome
 Gummy bear, a small, rubbery-textured confectionery in the form of a bear
 Gummi Bears (TV series), a Disney animated television series
 Gummy shark, a shark in the family Triakidae
 "Gummy", a song by Brockhampton from Saturation II
 Geummi (alternate spelling "Gummi"), member of Korean girl group Crayon Pop

See also 
 Gum (disambiguation)